Lance Martin (December 29, 1959 - May 15, 2020) was an American jazz flute player and music instructor at Wellesley College.

Martin was born in Pittsburgh, Pennsylvania, the son of a Baptist preacher. He started playing the flute at age seven, supposedly because his mother thought trumpets and drums were too loud. His early exposure to music was through the church and records he would get at his local library.

He went to Berklee College of Music  in Boston as a Jazz Composition Major. He joined Roxbury's Twelfth Baptist Church, and established the 12th Baptist Gospel Brass Ensemble, which played there for 30 years.

Martinalso regularly played at the Ryles Jazz Club in Cambridge as part of the Lance Martin Jazz Trio playing all-request sets for 36 years, their "most booked act".  The Lance Martin Band played in a style they called physical jazz, mixing visually physical movements with jazz, R&B, and gospel.

Discography
 Physical Jazz: The Lance Martin Band
 The Black Sea Salsa Band
 Black Orchid: The Ron Murphy CD
 Our Day will Come: Vivian Male
 Give Him Praise: Felix Mwangi
 Hey Stranger: Adrian Sicam
 African Underground Vol. 1 HIP-HOP Senega, Physical Jazz

References

External links
 Personal website

American jazz flautists
African-American jazz musicians
20th-century American male musicians
21st-century American male musicians
American male jazz musicians
20th-century African-American musicians
21st-century African-American musicians
20th-century flautists
21st-century flautists